Tricks and Treats may refer to:

 "Tricks and Treats" (American Horror Story), 2012 episode of American Horror Story
 "Tricks and Treats" (Freaks and Geeks), an episode of Freaks and Geeks
 "Tricks and Treats" (Hokey Wolf), 1960 episode of The Huckleberry Hound Show